Milner Langa Kabane Fort Hare Alumni, GCOB (18 June 1900 – 1945) was an educator, newspaper editor (Imvo Zabantsundu), human rights activist and a pioneer of the first "Bill of Rights" version in South Africa, which was unanimously adopted by many progressive organisations including the African National Congress in 1943.

Early life and education

Milner Langa Kabane was a political activist, born in Butterworth, Eastern Cape. Kabane studied at Heald-town and was one of the first three students to graduate from South African Native College (University of Fort Hare), earning a bachelor's degree and a teaching diploma in 1925. He earned a prize of 10 Guineas for Best Mathematical Student, which was presented by Senator A.W. Roberts in 1922 and completed his B.A. degree, cum laude. What distinguished the first group (Matthews, Ntlabati and others) was that they received lectures once or twice a year as the rest was self-study. A full report is available in 1928, Thirteenth Year, South African Native College (University of Fort Hare) Calendar, which motivated and garnered financial support for the establishment of the University of Fort Hare. The Calendar cited their performance as an epitome of excellence.

Career

Kabane started his career as a teacher and later taught at Lovedale College, near Alice. He also wrote many articles for Imvo Zabantsundu as both a journalist and editor of the Xhosa Newspaper. Whilst at Lovedale College, he groomed and taught many leaders, where he was later also appointed as a principal of that mission school. At the helm of Lovedale, some of his white colleagues took exception to be led by an African and duly conspired for his demotion.

However, Kabane remained steadfast in augmenting his qualifications and went to Yale University in the United States to study the Principles of Education and Psychology of Education. Returning from Yale, he went to teach at the Bloemfontein Bantu High School in the Orange Free State from the late 1930s and it was in that province where he became active in politics. In Bloemfontein, he stayed on the same street as Mr. T. M. Mapikela, Honorary Life Speaker, A.N.C., Executive member of the African National Congress.

Kabane was the president of (1) the Orange Free State Teachers' Association, (2) a member of the Africans' Claims committee and the (3) Orange Free State All African Convention (AAC) executive committee. He was instrumental in organising and formulating the first version of a document titled Bill of Rights and the Atlantic Charter from the African’s Point of View. The Orange Free State Teachers Association included Transvaal teachers.

Atlantic Charter

The 28 member Committee met at Bloemfontein and deliberated on the Atlantic Charter on Monday and Tuesday, 13 and 14 December 1943. The Committee elected Mr. Z.K. Matthews as Chairman and Mr. L.T. Mtimkulu as Secretary, and a Sub-Committee consisting of Messrs. S.B. Ngcobo, M.L. Kabane, and J.M. Nhlapo, with the chairman and the secretary as ex officio members, to draft the findings of the Atlantic Charter Committee. The main task of the committee was to (1) consider and interpret the Atlantic Charter, and (2) formulate the Bill of Rights. Their findings were unanimously adopted by the Annual Conference of the African National Congress at Bloemfontein, on 16 December 1943.
The full document is available in the ANC archives Early Years

International links

Milner Langa Kabane was also acknowledged by international academics and philosophers like W.E.B. Du Bois, who coined freedom phrases as used by Bob Marley, "Free yourself from mental slavery". W.E.B. Du Bois is internationally recognised for leading the Pan Africanist agenda among the African diaspora in the Americas and Europe. he was a sociologist, socialist, historian and civil rights activist. W.E.B. Du Bois sent invitation letters to Dr. A. Abdurrahman, 1921, found in Du Bois Papers, inviting them to the Pan African Congress planned for December 1929 in Tunis. Other invitations were also forwarded to John L. Dube, D. D. T. Jabavu, Milner Kabane of Imvo Zabantsundu as they were recognised as progressive South African Political leaders.

Death

Milner Langa Kabane met his untimely death in Bloemfontein at the age of 45. He was survived by his wife and 3 children (Temba, Nozipho, and Helen)

National Order of the Baobab

In 2017, the Democratic Republic of South Africa recognised his contribution by awarding him the National Order of the Baobab posthumously, one of the highest in the country. He was awarded "for his excellent contribution to the field of education and the upliftment of the black community during
the struggle for liberation. He lived by the courage of his conviction in adverse conditions."

References

 South African Minister of Higher Education Naledi Pandor speeches, 4 November 2004.
 Gerhart G.M and Karis T. (ed)(1977). From Protest to challenge: A documentary History of African Politics in South Africa: 1882–1964, Vol.4 Political Profiles 1882–1964. Hoover Institution Pres: Stanford University.
 Dr. AB Xuma papers, History Archives, Witwatersrand University
 Alfred Bathini Xuma, African Claims in South Africa, ANC Archives, The Early Years, 1943.
 Abiola Ade Lipede, For the degree of Doctor of Philosophy, At the University of York, Centre for African Studies, 1990.
 The Republic of South Africa, The Presidency, National Orders Booklet, 2017.
 South African History Online.

External links 
 https://dspace.gipe.ac.in/xmlui/handle/10973/33175
 https://web.archive.org/web/20120314020527/http://www.anc.org.za/show.php?id=4474&t=The 
 https://www.sahistory.org.za/people/milner-langa-kabane
 https://dspace.gipe.ac.in/xmlui/bitstream/handle/10973/33175/GIPE-018692-Contents.pdf?sequence=2&isAllowed=y

South African activists
1945 deaths
University of Fort Hare alumni
1900 births